Frayles de Guasave was a Mexican professional basketball club based in Guasave, Sinaloa. That played in the Circuito de Baloncesto de la Costa del Pacífico (CIBACOPA). Their home games were played at Luis Estrada Medina "El Convento".

In 2015, their youth team joined the Circuito de Basquetbol de Sinaloa (Cibasin), a local state league.

They played their last season in 2018 before the team moved to Guadalajara, becoming the Gigantes de Jalisco.

References

External links
 Official site
 Team profile at RealGM

Defunct basketball teams in Mexico
Sports teams in Sinaloa
Sport in Guasave
Basketball teams established in 2001
2001 establishments in Mexico